John D. Martin may refer to:

John Donelson Martin, American soldier
John Donelson Martin, Sr., American judge and John Donelson Martin's grandson
John D. Martin (author), American finance and business author and professor
J. D. Martin, American baseball player
John D. Martin RBA, British Impressionist / painter

See also
John Martin (disambiguation)